Apocalypse World is a post-apocalyptic roleplaying game by D. Vincent Baker and Meguey Baker, published in 2010 with only an implied setting that is fleshed out by the players in the course of character creation. It was the game for which the Powered by the Apocalypse engine was developed. On release, Apocalypse World won the 2010 Indie RPG Award and 2011 Golden Geek RPG of the year.

A second edition was successfully Kickstarted in 2016. This edition updated some of the mechanics (HX, battle-moves, threat map, etc.), playbooks (including replacing the Operator with Maestro-D and Quarantine), and brought Meguey Baker on board as co-designer, but retained most of the original's design.

Setting
The game's implied post-apocalyptic setting is fleshed out during character creation. Each playbook involves and provides inspiration for certain details of the setting, such as the Hardholder, who rules the local settlement and therefore has control over its size, population, and appearance. The characters' shared history is also determined in the course of character generation.  Themes of the game are survival and relationships, and they come out in the "pure lethality of the game".  Notably, the Master of Ceremonies (MC) is not supposed to do any planning before sitting down to the first session, so that all players have an opportunity to shape the game world collectively.

Game play
Apocalypse World is an archetype-based game.

Materials
 Three to five players (one to play the MC, Apocalypse Worlds name for the GM)
 Two six-sided dice each
 A different playbook for each player
 Quick reference sheets for "moves" and the MC's "fronts"

Game mechanics
The system uses the Powered by the Apocalypse engine. It features dice-rolling checks for challenging situations of 2d6 plus a relevant stat. Results of 10+ are successes, while 7 to 9 are partial successes or hard choices, and results of 6 or less allow the MC to make a move. A notable feature of Apocalypse World is the inclusion of a "special move" for each class, which triggers when a character of that class meets the appropriate triggers.

The stats are Cool, Hard (Violent, Intimidating), Hot, Sharp, and Weird (Psychic), with each PC having Hx (History) with every other PC. The default playbooks include the Hardholder, the Gunlugger, the Battlebabe, the Driver, the Chopper (Gang Leader), the Hocus (Cult Leader), the Brainer (Psychic), the Savvyhead (Mechanic/Inventor), and the Skinner (artist).

Reception
Reception was positive, with Apocalypse World winning numerous awards. There was praise for the streamlined nature of the game, as well as the MC job, although the inclusion of a sex move was controversial and was explicitly called out as not for children by SFSignal.

Academic PS Berge wrote, "Vincent and Meguey Baker's Apocalypse World (AW, 2010) marked the beginning of a critical era in 'fiction-first' TRPG design. [...] A violent, dystopian, wasteland-punk game, AW itself is less important to the legacy of independent TRPGs than the Bakers' invitation to other designers: 'If you've created a game inspired by Apocalypse World, and would like to publish it, please do'". James Hanna, for CBR in 2020, wrote that "ten years on, Powered by the Apocalypse games (PbtA) are everywhere. The Bakers designed the PbtA engine so that other game designers could 'hack' it, creating games with similar mechanics, but unique worlds and rules. More than four dozen games bear the PbtA license, making Apocalypse World incredibly influential. That influence continues to be felt as games move into new territories and find new audiences".

Awards
2010 Indie RPG Awards - Game of the Year - Winner
2010 Indie RPG Awards - Best Support - Winner
2010 Indie RPG Awards - Most Innovative Game - Winner
2011 Golden Geek Awards - RPG of the Year - Winner
2011 Lucca Comics & Games - Best Role-Playing Game - Winner

See also
 Monsterhearts
 Dungeon World
 Dogs in the Vineyard

References

Indie role-playing games
Role-playing games introduced in 2010
Post-apocalyptic role-playing games